The 2014–15 UNC Wilmington Seahawks men's basketball team represented the University of North Carolina Wilmington during the 2014–15 NCAA Division I men's basketball season. The Seahawks, led by first year head coach Kevin Keatts, played their home games at the Trask Coliseum and were members of the Colonial Athletic Association. They finished the season 18–14, 12–6 in CAA play to finish in a four-way tie for the CAA regular season championship. They advanced to the semifinals of the CAA tournament where they lost to Northeastern. They were invited to the CollegeInsider.com Tournament where they lost in the first round to Sam Houston State.

Previous season
The Seahawks finished the season 9–23, 3–13 in CAA play to finish in last place. They lost in the first round of the CAA tournament to Hofstra.

Departures

Incoming Transfers

Under NCAA transfer rules, Bryan, Flemmings, Haywood, and Ingram will all have to redshirt for the 2014–15 season. Will have three years of remaining eligibility.

Recruiting Class of 2014

Early Class of 2015 Recruits

Roster

Schedule

|-
!colspan=9 style="background:#006666; color:#FFFF66;"| Exhibition

|-
!colspan=9 style="background:#006666; color:#FFFF66;"| Non-Conference Regular season

|-
!colspan=9 style="background:#006666; color:#FFFF66;"| CAA Regular Season

|-
!colspan=9 style="background:#006666; color:#FFFF66;"| CAA tournament

|-
!colspan=9 style="background:#006666; color:#FFFF66;"| CIT

See also
2014–15 UNC Wilmington Seahawks women's basketball team

References

UNC Wilmington Seahawks men's basketball seasons
UNC Wilmington
UNC Wilmington